Robbin Dale Mallicoat (born November 16, 1964) is an American former Major League Baseball left-handed reliever who played professional baseball from 1985 through 1995. He was drafted by the Detroit Tigers in the 8th round of the 1983 draft (out of high school) and then again between his freshman and sophomore year by the Houston Astros in the first round of the 1984 amateur draft. He is 6'3" tall and weighed 192 pounds. He batted and threw left. Mallicoat was never able to win a game as a Major Leaguer but did pick up one save. It came on August 18, 1991 when Mallicoat pitched the final 3 innings of a 8-4 Astros win over the Los Angeles Dodgers. He saved the game for starter Mark Portugal.

References

External links

Living people
1964 births
Major League Baseball pitchers
Taft Cougars baseball players
Osceola Astros players
Houston Astros players
Tucson Toros players
Omaha Royals players
People from St. Helens, Oregon
Baseball players from Oregon
American expatriate baseball players in Taiwan
Asheville Tourists players
Auburn Astros players
China Times Eagles players
Columbus Astros players
Corpus Christi Barracudas players
Gulf Coast Astros players
Jackson Generals (Texas League) players
Rancho Cucamonga Quakes players